The 2017 Bulgarian Supercup was the 14th Bulgarian Supercup, an annual Bulgarian football match played between the winners of the previous season's First Professional Football League and Bulgarian Cup. The game was played between the champions of the 2016-17 First League, Ludogorets Razgrad, and the 2017 Bulgarian Cup winners, Botev Plovdiv.

This was Ludogorets's fifth Bulgarian Supercup appearance and Botev's second. Both teams already competed against each other for the 2014 Supercup final which ended with a 3−1 victory for Ludogorets. The 2017 game ended 1−1 in regular time and after 5−4 on penalties Botev clinched their first Supercup win.

Match overview

Match details

Post-match reactions

References

2017
Supercup
Sport in Burgas
Bulgaria
Botev Plovdiv matches
PFC Ludogorets Razgrad matches
Bulgarian Supercup 2017